Tommy Murphy (born 8 January 1962 in Newtownards) is a Northern Irish former professional snooker player. 


Career
Murphy won the Northern Ireland Amateur Championship and All-Ireland Amateur Championship in 1981. Before turning professional, Murphy was an apprentice coffin-maker. In 1987, Willie Thorne made a maximum break against Murphy in the UK Championship. Although this was the first maximum in almost four years, it was not televised.

As a professional, Murphy's best ranking finishes were last 16 appearances at the 1987 British Open and the 1988 Classic. At the Irish Professional Championship in 1982 and 1986 he reached the semi-final, on both occasions being defeated by eventual champion Dennis Taylor. He also represented Northern Ireland at their infamous World Cup campaign. Teaming up with Taylor and Alex Higgins, Northern Ireland reached the final which ended with defeat to Canada and Higgins threatening to have Taylor shot.

This was Murphy's last notable appearance at a tournament, and he lost his professional status in 1994.

Performance and rankings timeline

Career finals

Team finals: 1

Amateur finals: 2 (2 titles)

References

1962 births
Living people
Snooker players from Northern Ireland